is a railway station in Uda, Nara Prefecture, Japan.

Lines
Kintetsu Railway
Osaka Line

Layout
Sambommatsu Station has two opposed side platforms.

Adjacent stations

Railway stations in Japan opened in 1930
Railway stations in Nara Prefecture
Uda, Nara